Han Shu (1922 – 31 May 2004) was a Chinese military officer.

Biography
Han was born and raised in Lingshi County, Shanxi. He joined the Chinese Workers' and Peasants' Red Army in March 1936 and joined the Chinese Communist Party in April 1937. During the Second Sino-Japanese War, he had served as a propagandist, captain, director, and political commissar. During the Chinese Communist Revolution, he was a regimental commander in the People's Liberation Army. During the Korean War, he commanded the 117th Division. He was promoted to the rank of Senior colonel in 1955. He was retired from the post of Deputy Commander of the 38th Army. On May 31, 2004, he died in Suzhou, Jiangsu.

Personal life
Han Shu's wife was once the leading lady in the Chinese People's Liberation Army Naval Song and Dance Troupe, his daughter is a noted musician in Canada, his granddaughter Cecilia Han is a noted singer and actress in China.

References

1922 births
2004 deaths
People from Lingshi County